Karl-Heinz Marsell (1 August 1936 – 23 September 1996) was a German professional cyclist who was active between 1955 and 1966, predominantly in motor-paced racing. In this discipline he won the world championships in 1961 and finished in third place in 1964; he also won three European (1955, 1957 and 1959) and three national titles (1960, 1961 and 1963).

References

1936 births
1996 deaths
German male cyclists
Cyclists from Dortmund
UCI Track Cycling World Champions (men)
German track cyclists
20th-century German people